The Cutlass class is a class of fast patrol boat of the British Royal Navy.

The two vessels of this class are a commercial HPB-1900 design, built to military specifications by Merseyside-based Marine Specialised Technology at a cost of £9.9m for two (including 4 years support).
The vessels are being assigned to serve in a sovereignty protection and coastal security role with the Royal Navy's Gibraltar Squadron. The first vessel, HMS Cutlass, arrived in Gibraltar in November 2021 while the second, HMS Dagger, arrived in Gibraltar in March 2022.

Vessels in the class

See also

References

Ships of the Royal Navy
Cutlass-class patrol vessels